Julio Esteban Fierro Díaz (born 9 April 2002) is a Chilean footballer who plays as goalkeeper for San Antonio Unido on loan from Colo-Colo.

Club career
He made his professional debut in a Primera División match against Ñublense on May 1, 2021.

In 2023, he joined on loan to San Antonio Unido in the Segunda División Profesional de Chile.

International career
At early age, he represented Chile U15 at the 2017 South American U-15 Championship in Argentina. After, Fierro represented Chile U17 at the 2019 South American U17 Championship and 2019 FIFA U17 World Cup playing all the matches.

Also, he was part of the Chile U23 squad at the 2020 Pre-Olympic Tournament, but he didn't play.

Career statistics

Club
 

Notes

International

Honours

Club
Colo-Colo
 Copa Chile (1): 2019

References

External links

2002 births
Living people
Footballers from Santiago
Chilean footballers
Chile youth international footballers
Chilean Primera División players
Colo-Colo footballers
Segunda División Profesional de Chile players
San Antonio Unido footballers
Association football goalkeepers